Iron City is the name of three places in the United States:
Iron City, Georgia
Iron City, Tennessee
Iron City, Utah, a ghost town
It is a minor nickname for Pittsburgh, Pennsylvania.

Other
Iron City (novel), a book by Lloyd Brown
Iron City (album), an album by jazz guitarist Grant Green
Iron City Beer, a local beer in Pittsburgh, Pennsylvania, made by the Iron City Brewing Company